Ar-Rubayʿi is a sub-district located in the At-Ta'iziyah District, Taiz Governorate, Yemen. Ar-Rubayʿi had a population of 11,498 according to the 2004 census.

References  

Sub-districts in At-Ta'iziyah District